The South Pacific Area (SOPAC) was a multinational U.S.-led military command active during World War II. It was a part of the U.S. Pacific Ocean Areas under Admiral Chester Nimitz.

The delineation and establishment of the Pacific Ocean Areas was negotiated by the Allied governments of the United States, the United Kingdom, Australia, New Zealand, and the Kingdom of the Netherlands in March–April 1942 in response to the Japanese attacks in Southeast Asia and the Pacific. The South Pacific Area was bounded on the west by the Southwest Pacific Area, on the north by the Central Pacific Area, and on the east by the Southeast Pacific Area.  It originally encompassed the Ellice, Phoenix, Marquesas, Tuamotu, Samoa, Fiji, and New Hebrides island groups plus New Caledonia and New Zealand. Its western boundary was shifted to just west of Guadalcanal on 1 August 1942 to facilitate operations against that island.

Background
The assignment orders for Major General Millard Harmon as the Commanding General, Army Forces, South Pacific, dated 7 July 1942, said:

"The establishment of the Pacific Ocean Area as an area of United States strategical responsibility under the command of the Commander-in-Chief, U.S. Pacific Fleet, became effective on May 8, 1942. The Commander-in-Chief, U.S. Pacific Fleet, has been designated the "Commander-in-Chief, Pacific Ocean Area". Under the Commander-in-Chief, Pacific Ocean Area, a U.S. Naval officer has been designated as "Commander, South Pacific Area". The South Pacific Force under COMSOPAC include the following:
1. All base and local defense forces (ground, naval and air) now assigned or to be assigned to forces in the South Pacific Area. The New Zealand Chiefs of Staff are responsible for the land defense of New Zealand, subject to such strategic decisions affecting this responsibility as may be made by the Commander-in-Chief, Pacific Fleet, for the conduct of naval operations in the Pacific Ocean Areas.
2. Assigned New Zealand, Free French, Dutch and other United Nations Naval forces.
3. Such fleet types and aircraft as may be assigned by the Commander-in-Chief, U.S. Pacific Fleet."

In July 1942 the South Pacific Area, under Admiral Robert L. Ghormley, superseded by Admiral William Halsey Jr. from 16 October, comprised four commands: Amphibious Forces, South Pacific (AmphibForSoPac), under Admiral Richmond K. Turner, South Pacific Naval Forces under Admiral Ghormley, U.S. Army Forces South Pacific under Major General Millard Harmon, and South Pacific Air Forces under Admiral John S. McCain, Sr. At a later stage Transport Group, South Pacific (TransGrpSoPac) was added to the organisation.

The organisation's first major battle was the Battle of Guadalcanal. Admiral Ghormley's Operations Order 1-42 established two task forces, Task Force 61 and Task Force 63, to carry out the operation.

On September 20, 1942, six weeks after the first American amphibious operation of the war got underway at Guadalcanal, Vice Admiral Aubrey Fitch assumed command of Aircraft, South Pacific Force (AirSoPac). Not a desk-bound admiral, he carried out numerous, hazardous flights into the combat zones, inspecting air activities and bases for projected operations. For these, he received a Distinguished Flying Cross. AirSoPac ultimately encompassing U.S. Navy, Army, Marine Corps, and Royal New Zealand Air Force air units. It saw  great success aiding the Allied campaign in the area.

Commander, Aircraft, Solomons (ComAirSols), directed the combat operations of all land-based air forces in the Solomons during Operation Cartwheel, under the direction of AirSoPac. Rear Admiral Charles P. Mason was the first officer to hold the title ComAirSols; he assumed command on 15 February 1943 at Guadalcanal. Actually, Mason took over a going concern, as he relieved Brigadier General Francis P. Mulcahy, who had controlled all aircraft stationed at the island during the final phase of its defense. Mulcahy, who became Mason's chief of staff, was also Commanding General, 2d Marine Aircraft Wing. The fact that a general headed the staff of an admiral is perhaps the best indication of the multiservice nature of AirSols operations.

Vice Admiral Finch retained two areas of flight operations under his direct control; sea search by long range Navy patrol planes and Army bombers, and transport operations by South Pacific Combat Air Transport Command (SCAT). Throughout its long and useful life (November 1942-February 1945), SCAT's complement of Marine and Army transports was headed by Marine Aircraft Group 25's commanding officer. SCAT's operations area moved northward with the fighting during 1943, and by August's end, all regularly scheduled flights in SoPac's rear areas were being handled by the Naval Air Transport Service (NATS).

Commanders, South Pacific Area 
 Vice Admiral Robert L. Ghormley (17 May–18 October 1942)
 Vice Adm./Adm. William Halsey, Jr. (18 October 1942 – 15 June 1944)
 Vice Adm. John H. Newton (15 June 1944 – 13 March 1945)
 Vice Admiral William L. Calhoun (13 March–2 September 1945)

See also 
 United States Army Air Forces in the South Pacific Area

Notes

Henry I. Shaw, Jr. and Major Douglas T. Kane, USMC, History of U.S. Marine Corps Operations in World War II: Volume II: Isolation of Rabaul, Historical Branch, G-3 Division, Headquarters, U.S. Marine Corps, 1963

References 

 OPNAV 29-P1000 

Allied commands of World War II
Military units and formations established in 1942
Military units and formations disestablished in the 1940s